Shakespeare in Love is a South Korean play by Kim Dong-yeon adapted from the 1998 film of the same name. It premiered at the CJ Towol Theater in the Seoul Arts Center on January 28, 2023.

Cast and characters

Production 

The play is produced by Shownote. It is directed by Kim Dong-yeon and produced by Song Han-saem. The script was translated by Lee In-soo. Ji-hye, Song Hee-jin and Seo Jeong-ju served as music director, choreography director and martial arts director respectively. Park Sang-bong designed the stage, Choi Bo-yoon took charge of lighting, while Do-yeon served as the costume designer in the play.

Auditions for supporting roles and ensembles were held in June 2022.

Shakespeare In Love became the first South Korean play of which ticket price exceeded 100,000 won. The production company said that the price hike was inevitable, stating "The play is having its first run in Korea, so we had to create everything from scratch ― the set, lighting, costume and others. We had to bring most of the set props from outside of Korea because the play is set in the 16th-century Renaissance period, characterized by its extravagance and glamor. Due to inflation, labor costs have also gone up."

Staging 
It is staged at the CJ Towol Theater in the Seoul Arts Center from January 28 to March 26, 2023.

References

External links
  

2023 plays
Cultural depictions of William Shakespeare
Plays based on real people
Plays set in London
Plays set in the 16th century
Plays based on films